Arun Sankosik (8 May 1925 – before 2007) was a Thai athlete and sports coach. He was best known as a rugby player, playing several international events with the Thai national team and becoming its first coach in 1954. He was a member of the board of the Thai Rugby Union as well as its head coach, and also played football and athletics, competing in the men's 100 metres event at Thailand's first Summer Olympics, Helsinki 1952. He worked as a teacher at Vajiravudh College, serving as housemaster of Chitralada House and the school's head rugby coach, until his retirement in 1986.

References

External links
 

1925 births
Year of death missing
Arun Sankosik
Arun Sankosik
Arun Sankosik
Athletes (track and field) at the 1952 Summer Olympics
Arun Sankosik
Arun Sankosik